Paco Boublard (born 20 February 1981) is French actor and photographer. He is known for his roles in various TV series and for his role in the film Regarde-moi (Look at Me) by Audrey Estrougo, which won three awards. Alongside his acting, he made a career as a journalist and photographer.

Life and career 
In 1999, Paco Boublard met his first talent agent, Stephane Lefebvre. He began his career by joining the small screen. In 2002 and 2003, performing roles in Commissaire Moulin, Navarro, or R.I.S, police scientifique which was his debut in television.

In 2005, he landed the lead role in the film Regarde-moi (Look at Me) by Audrey Estrougo (which film won Talents des Cités award 2005,  Arlequin prize for Best Junior Screenplay 2006). That same year he joined the agency as agent agitator. In 2009, he was crowned best new actor at the Festival de la fiction TV de La Rochelle for his role in the TV movie :fr:Belleville Story by Arnaud Malherbe (which incidentally, was also awarded the prize for best TV movie).

Meanwhile, Paco Boublard was developing a career as a photographer.

After meeting with director Stéphane Davi for various audiovisual projects,  in 2010 he joined  collectif artistique Objectif496.

Filmography

Film 
 2015 : The Night Watchman : Le Bouclé 
 2014 : The Connection : Flic Stéphane
 2013 : Mohamed Dubois : Julien
 2012 : Paulette : Vito
 2010 : L'Oiseau de Chine (Short) : Kylian
 2010 : Les Princes de la nuit : Caid 4
 2010 : Rebecca H. (Return to the Dogs) : Neighborhood Teenager
 2010 : Le Mac : Doggy Bag
 2008 : Secrets of State (Secret Défense) : Beur
 2008 : Go Fast : Kader
 2007 : Regarde-moi : Yannick 
 2002 : The Code (La Mentale) : Franck

Television 
 2013 : Léo Matteï, Brigade des Mineurs - (Season 1, Episode 1) : Cambrioleur 1 (Burglar 1)
 2012 : Caïn - (Season 1, Episode 6 ) : Mohand
 2011 : Victoire Bonnot - (Season 1, Episode 4) : Milan 
 2011 : Les Beaux Mecs (mini-series) - (Episodes 1-5 & 7) : Bambi
 2010 : Enquêtes réservées - (Season 2, Episode 1) : Rougier
 2010 : A Suspicion of Innocence (Un soupçon d'innocence) (TV Movie) : Tony
 2010 : Belleville Story (TV Movie) : Freddy
 2010-2013 : Boulevard du Palais - (S11, E04 & S15, E01&02) : Larrieu & Sherman 
 2009 : Julie Lescaut - (Season 20, Episode 1) : Valack 
 2009 : Les Tricheurs - (Season 3, Episode 1) : Marco
 2008-2009 : Palizzi - (S01, E01&06 & S02, E28&31) : Steve & Résidant du foyer (Resident of the Home)
 2008 : Night Squad - (Season 6, Episode 4) : Mourad
 2008 : Cellule Identité - (Season 1, Episode 1) : Le jeune détenu (Young Prisoner)
 2008 : Une Femme D'Honneur - (Season 1, Episode 37) : Sanchez
 2007 : Diane - Crime Fighter (Diane Femme Flic) - (Season 4, Episode 6) : Pascal
 2007 : Poison D'Avril (TV Movie) : Un jeune de banlieue (Suburban Youth)
 2007 : RIS police scientifique - (Season 2, Episode 5) : Janson 
 2006 : Commissaire Moulin - (Season 8, Episode 3) : Duegi
 2006-2009 : Les bleus: premiers pas dans la police - (S01, E01 & S02, E03-04) : Braqueur bijouterie 2 (Jewel Thief 2) & Nicolas
 2002 : You'll Get Over It, (À cause d'un garçon) (TV Movie) : Swimming Teammate 1
 2001 : Margaux Valence: Le secret d'Alice (TV Movie) : Luc

Awards
 Révélation masculine of the Festival de la fiction TV de La Rochelle 2009 for the TV movie  Belleville Story

References

External links 

 

French male film actors
Living people
1981 births
21st-century French male actors
French male television actors
Male actors from Paris
French photographers